Isoetes bolanderi, or Bolander's quillwort, is a species of quillwort, a type of lycophyte. This aquatic plant is native to high altitude regions of the western United States and southern Alberta. It grows almost entirely underwater in lakes and other water bodies from a corm-like stem, which remains buried in the mud, producing up to twenty pointed, cylindrical leaves approaching 15 centimeters in maximum length. It reproduces via spherical sporangia, covered about one third by the velum. The ligule is small and heart-shaped. The megaspores are white, though sometimes bluish, and 350 to 290 micrometers in diameter. The microspores are 25 to 30 micrometers long.

References

External links
Jepson Manual Treatment
USDA Plants Profile
Photo gallery

bolanderi
Flora of Alberta
Flora of the Western United States